The 2018 Ohio State Buckeyes football team represented Ohio State University during the 2018 NCAA Division I FBS football season. The Buckeyes played their home games at Ohio Stadium in Columbus, Ohio. This was the Buckeyes' 129th overall season and 106th as a member of the Big Ten Conference. They were led by head coach Urban Meyer in his seventh and final season at Ohio State.

Shortly before the season, head coach Urban Meyer was placed on administrative leave due to allegations that he was aware of domestic violence incidents involving former wide receivers coach Zach Smith. Ryan Day was named acting head coach. After a lengthy investigation, Meyer was suspended for three games for poor handling of the situation. Day acted as the head coach during Meyer's suspension.

The Buckeyes won each of their three games under Ryan Day to open the season, including a victory over then-No. 15 TCU in AT&T Stadium in Arlington, Texas. After Urban Meyer's return, Ohio State won their following four games, including a close win on the road over then-No. 9 Penn State. Ohio State rose to second in the AP Poll, but suffered a devastating loss on the road to Purdue, 49–20. The Buckeyes won their remaining regular season games, however, and secured a spot in the 2018 Big Ten Football Championship Game after defeating rival No. 4 Michigan 62–39. Ohio State defeated West Division champion Northwestern in that game convincingly, 45–24, but in the final College Football Playoff rankings of the year, the Buckeyes were ranked sixth, leaving them just outside the playoff for the second consecutive year. The team was invited to the Rose Bowl to play Pac-12 Conference champion Washington. In the weeks before the game, Urban Meyer announced that he would retire at the end of the season, and the Rose Bowl would be his final game as head coach. The Buckeyes won the game to finish the year at 13–1, and were ranked third in the final polls.

The team was led offensively by quarterback Dwayne Haskins, who led FBS with 4,831 passing yards and 50 passing touchdowns, both of which set school records by wide margins. Haskins was named Big Ten Offensive Player of the Year and was a finalist for the Heisman Trophy, finishing in third. On the ground, running backs J. K. Dobbins and Mike Weber combined for over 2,000 yards rushing. Wide receiver Parris Campbell led the team with 1,063 receiving yards and a Big Ten-leading 12 receiving touchdowns. Defensive star and pre-season All-American lineman Nick Bosa suffered a groin injury during the game against TCU. He underwent surgery and elected not to return to the team, instead focusing on recovering for the 2019 NFL Draft.

Previous season 
The Buckeyes finished the 2017 season 12–2, 8–1 in Big Ten play to win the East division. They defeated Wisconsin in the Big Ten Championship 27–21. However, despite an 11–2 record, they failed to receive an invitation to the College Football Playoff. Instead, they received a bid to the Cotton Bowl Classic where they defeated USC 24–7.

Offseason

2018 NFL Draft

Recruiting

Recruiting class
The Buckeyes signed a total of 26 recruits. The class was rated as the second best in the country behind Georgia by the 247Sports Composite, and the best class in the Big Ten Conference. Headlining the class were consensus five star recruits Nicholas Petit-Frere (offensive tackle), Taron Vincent (defensive tackle), and Tyreke Johnson (safety).

Position key

Preseason

Award watch lists

Schedule

Source

Rankings

Personnel

Roster

Depth chart
Starters and backups.

Coaching changes

 Wide receiver coach Zach Smith was fired in July 2018 after domestic violence allegations came to light. Brian Hartline was named interim WR coach.
Head coach Urban Meyer was placed on administrative leave after reports surfaced claiming he knew about Smith's incidents of domestic violence. Ryan Day was named acting head coach.

Game summaries

Oregon State

Game Statistics

Game Leaders

Rutgers

Game Statistics

Game Leaders

vs. TCU

Tulane

Game Statistics

Game Leaders

at Penn State

Indiana

Game Statistics

Game Leaders

Minnesota

Game Statistics

Game Leaders

at Purdue

Nebraska

Game Statistics

Game Leaders

at Michigan State

Game Statistics

Game Leaders

at Maryland

Michigan

Big Ten Championship Game

Game Statistics

Game Leaders

Rose Bowl

Awards and honors 

*The NCAA and Ohio State only recognize the AP, AFCA, FWAA, Sporting News and WCFF All-American teams to determine if a player is a Consensus or Unanimous All-American. To be named a Consensus All-American, a player must be named first team in three polls and to be Unanimous, they must be named first team in all five.

Players drafted into the NFL

References

Ohio State
Ohio State Buckeyes football seasons
Big Ten Conference football champion seasons
Rose Bowl champion seasons
Ohio State Buckeyes football